In the context of artificial neural network, pruning is the practice of removing parameters (which may entail removing individual parameters, or parameters in groups such as by neurons) from an existing network. The goal of this process is to maintain accuracy of the network while increasing its efficiency. This can be done to reduce the computational resources required to run the neural network.

A basic algorithm for pruning is as follows:
Evaluate the importance of each neuron.
Rank the neurons according to their importance (assuming there is a clearly defined measure for "importance").
Remove the least important neuron.
Check a termination condition (to be determined by the user) to see whether to continue pruning.
Recently a highly pruning three layer tree architecture, has achieved a similar success rate to that of LeNet-5 on the CIFAR-10 dataset with a lesser computational complexity.

References 

Artificial neural networks